Medenine is one of the 24 governorates (provinces) of Tunisia.

Geography
The governorate encompasses the south-easternmost coastal strip, totalling 9167 km2 and had a population of 479,520 at the 2014 census. The capital is Medenine. The governorate includes the country's largest island, Djerba, which is connected by a ferry boat and has over a third of the total population of the governate and its own airport.

The area is generally lowlands.  It extends in two projections at its extreme ends a maximum of 60 km from the coast, otherwise the neighbouring division of Tataouine is 30 km from the coast.  The northern projection abuts Kebili Governorate and includes part of a long escarpment which extends from the south of Gabes Governorate (adjoining Medenine to the north) to beyond Tripoli in Libya and which is dotted with settlements.  Precipitation is low and reaches a maximum between October and January, the far north of the governorate and western hill range benefiting from this most.  Key settlements are those associated with ports, tourism, fishing, farming in more fertile parts within the north-east and oases.

Administrative divisions
The governorate is divided into nine delegations (mutamadiyat), listed below with their populations at the 2004 and 2014 Censuses:

Seven municipalities are in Medenine Governorate:

References

 
Governorates of Tunisia